Evernia illyrica is a species of lichen belonging to the family Parmeliaceae.

It is native to Europe.

References

Parmeliaceae
Lichen species
Taxa named by Alexander Zahlbruckner
Lichens described in 1904
Lichens of Europe